Sax is an unincorporated community in McDavitt Township, Saint Louis County, Minnesota, United States.

Geography
The community is located 9 miles northwest of Cotton at the intersection of Saint Louis County Highway 7 (CR 7) and County Road 28 (Sax Road). County Road 52 (Arkola Road) is nearby.

History
A post office called Sax was established in 1916, and remained in operation until 1930. The community was named for Solomon Saxe, an original owner of the town site.

Arts and culture
The nearby Sax–Zim Bog area is home to one of the world's best birdwatching places and the site of the annual Sax–Zim Winter Birding Festival held in February. The bog was named for the two nearby communities of Sax and Zim.

References

Unincorporated communities in Minnesota
Unincorporated communities in St. Louis County, Minnesota